Marcel Boiteux (born 9 May 1922) is French economist, mathematician, and senior civil service member.

Boiteux was born in Niort on 9 May 1922. He joined the EDF in 1949 as a student of Maurice Allais, and remained there for the rest of his career. In 1959, Marcel Boiteux became the President of the Econometric Society. From 1967 through 1987, he was the director of EDF. He theorizes and implements the price of electricity at marginal cost, and is one of the architects of France's nuclear industry development.

His journey illuminates a social environment (that of scientists and senior civil services), a research process (marginal cost), a large company and its strategy, public sector career and power mechanisms, State-public-company relations, and decision-making processes on important issues such as nuclear policy.

On December 14, 1992, he was elected to the chair left vacant by Émile James' death in the Academy of Moral and Political Sciences.

Biography

Education 
He graduated from the Ecole Normale in 1942 and received his mathematics aggregation in 1946. In 1947, he also graduated, in the economics section, from the Institute of Political Studies in Paris where he was a classmate of Pierre Moussa.

Marcel Boiteux began his professional career in 1946 by entering the National Center for Scientific Research (CNRS), under the responsibility of Maurice Allais and having Gérard Debreu as a colleague. The latter would obtain a Rockefeller scholarship from Maurice Allais.

He joined EDF on April 1, 1949 as an engineer in the sales department on the recommendation of Maurice Allais.

He turned 100 on 9 May 2022.

References 

1922 births
Living people
French centenarians
People from Niort
French economists
Presidents of the Econometric Society
Members of the Académie des sciences morales et politiques
Men centenarians